HMS Spanker was a Sharpshooter-class torpedo gunboat of the Royal Navy. She was launched in 1889, converted to a minesweeper in 1909 and sold for breaking in 1920.

Construction
Spanker was laid down at Devonport Dockyard on 12 April 1888 and launched on 22 February 1889. She was commissioned at Devonport on 17 October 1890.

Her class were fitted with 2 sets of triple-expansion steam engines, and in Spankers case these were built by G E Bayliss & Co. She was fitted at build with locomotive boilers, but these were replaced with water-tube Du Temple boilers some time between 1895 and 1898. The bottom of these boilers, unlike normal Du Temple boilers, were cylindrical with end doors, instead of with bolted covers.

Service

Naval manoeuvres (1892)
During naval manoeuvres in 1892 Spanker and the monitor  were disabled by leaky boilers and defective steering gear.

Naval Review (1897)
She was present at the Naval Review at Spithead in celebration of Queen Victoria's Diamond Jubilee on 26 June 1897.

Naval manoeuvres (1900)
She was mobilised for naval manoeuvres on 10 July 1900.

Lieutenant Thomas Brandreth was appointed in command 14 January 1902, when she served in the Channel Fleet. She took part in the fleet review held at Spithead on 16 August 1902 for the coronation of King Edward VII.

Diving experiments (1906)
In 1906, Spanker took part in a Royal Navy investigation of deep-sea diving. On 8 March 1908 Spanker was on passage from Portsmouth to Sheerness where she was to join up with ships of the Nore Division of the Home Fleet for Naval exercises when her engines failed off Bembridge on the Isle of Wight. While under tow back to Portsmouth, she ran aground off Southsea Castle, and was not freed until the next day. In November 1908, Spanker entered refit at Pembroke Dockyard, with the ship requiring partial replating of her decks. The refit was completed by 1 March 1909.

Conversion to minesweeper (1909)
In 1909 she and four of her sister ships were converted to minesweepers. The torpedo tubes were removed, but the ships retained their guns. The minesweeping equipment constituted a kite winch and gallows fitted on the quarterdeck. She was assigned to the North Sea Fisheries as a tender to  under the orders of the Admiral Commanding Coast Guard and Reserves.

World War I

On 15 April 1913 Spanker was recommissioned at Portsmouth and served throughout World War I. From 1914, under Lieutenant Commander N M C Thurstan and then Lieutenant Commander F C Corbyn, she served in the North Sea. In June 1915, Spanker was attached to the Grand Fleet, but in July that year, she moved with sister ship  to Harwich in order to support operations of the Harwich Force.

From 1917, under the command of Lieutenant H Annall RNR, she formed part of the 13th Fast Minesweeping Flotilla at Oban.

Fate
By 1919 she was listed on the disposal list as a first class gunboat. She was sold on 20 March 1920 to the Cornish Salvage Company of Ilfracombe for breaking.

Notes

References

Bibliography

1889 ships
Ships built in Plymouth, Devon
Sharpshooter-class torpedo gunboats
Victorian-era gunboats of the United Kingdom
World War I minesweepers of the United Kingdom
Minesweepers of the Royal Navy